Markus Holemar (born 18 June 1976 in Austria) is an Austrian footballer who plays for SC Wolfsthal in his home country.

Career

Holemar started his senior career with 1. Simmeringer SC. In 1996, he signed for FK Austria Wien in the Austrian Football Bundesliga, where he made four appearances and scored zero goals. After that, he played for Scottish club Heart of Midlothian, and Austrian clubs SK Vorwärts Steyr, First Vienna, DSV Leoben, LASK, SV Schwechat, 1. Simmeringer SC, SKN St. Pölten, Wiener Sport-Club, SV Horn, SKU Amstetten, Marchfeld Donauauen, SK Schwadorf, ASC Götzendorf, FK Hainburg, SV Haitzendorf, SC Ostbahn XI, SV Würmla, ASK Eggendorf, SC Lassee, UFC Obritz, and SC Wolfsthal, where he now plays.

References

External links 
 Holemar: "Schottland war am Schönsten!" 
 Holemar: "Das war eine Manager-Geschichte" 
 „Ich war für Schottland zu jung“
 Interview mit Markus Holemar 
 Ein klassischer Spielmacher 
 HINTERGRUND
 Holemar kam, sah und siegte 
 Die Revanche des Markus Holemar

Heart of Midlothian F.C. players
Expatriate footballers in Scotland
Living people
1976 births
Austrian footballers
Association football midfielders
Austrian expatriate footballers
LASK players
FK Austria Wien players
1. Simmeringer SC players
SV Schwechat players
SK Vorwärts Steyr players
First Vienna FC players
DSV Leoben players
Wiener Sport-Club players
SKN St. Pölten players
SV Horn players
SKU Amstetten players
SC Ostbahn XI players
SV Würmla players